Allium longistylum, also called riverside chive, is a species of wild onion native to Korea and northern China (Hebei, Inner Mongolia, Shanxi). It grows at elevations of 1500–3000 m.

Allium longistylum has bulbs rarely more than 8 mm across. Scape is up to 50 cm high. Leaves are about the same length as the scape but only 2–3 mm across. Umbels are spherical. Flowers are red or reddish-purple.

References

longistylum
Onions
Flora of China
Flora of Korea
Plants described in 1874
Taxa named by John Gilbert Baker